The following is a list of organizations with Morrison in their name.

Companies
 Morrison & Foerster, American law firm
 Morrison & Sinclair, Sydney, Australia, ship builder
 Morrison Construction, Scottish construction company (acquired by Galliford Try in 2006)
 Morrison Facilities Services, United Kingdom housing company (acquired by Mears Group in 2012)
 Morrison Hershfield, North American engineering and management firm

Record labels
 Morrison Records (Australia), an independent Australian jazz label
 Morrison Records (Seattle), an independent 20th century Seattle, USA label

Schools
 Morrison's Academy, Crieff, Scotland
 Morrison Academy, Taichung, Taiwan
 Morrison Glace Bay High School, Glace Bay, Nova Scotia

Other
 Morrison Arboretum, Morrison, Oklahoma, USA
 Morrison Hotel (Chicago), USA
 Morrison Institute of Public Policy, Arizona State University, USA